"You Want It Darker" is a song by Canadian poet and musician Leonard Cohen, released on September 21, 2016, Cohen's 82nd birthday. It is the title track from Cohen's album You Want It Darker. The song earned the artist a Grammy Award for Best Rock Performance and features the vocals of Cantor Gideon Zelermeyer and Shaar Hashomayim Choir.

References

2016 songs
Leonard Cohen songs
Songs written by Leonard Cohen
Grammy Award for Best Rock Song